Wayne Howard (born April 30, 1931) is a former American football coach.  He was head coach at UC Riverside from 1972 to 1973, Long Beach State from 1974 to 1976 and Utah from 1977 to 1981. He had a career college football record of 70–37–2.

Early life
A native of Denver, Howard attended Jordan High School in Long Beach, California before transferring in his senior year to Chaffey High School in Ontario, California, from which he graduated in 1948. He played college baseball at the University of Redlands in Redlands, California, graduating in 1957 with a Bachelor of Arts degree. His time at Redlands was interrupted by five years of military service as a flying officer in the United States Air Force.

Coaching career
Utah lured Howard away from Long Beach State after three winning seasons as head coach there. During his five seasons at Utah, his winning percentage of .554 was better than that of his predecessor, Tom Lovat (.152), and his successor, Chuck Stobart (.489).

His final season at Utah, Howard had the Utes in contention to win the Western Athletic Conference championship, needing to win the final game against BYU to take the title. He retired after losing to BYU, but he was not clear why. He later said, "I just did. No real reason. I wasn't unhappy. I was not treated badly. I really never tried to get another job. I liked it there. They treated me well."

BYU rivalry

During the BYU game in 1977, BYU head coach LaVell Edwards put starting quarterback Marc Wilson back into the game with two minutes remaining so that Wilson could set a then NCAA record for 571 passing yards in a game. BYU won 38–8. After the game, Howard said, "This today will be inspiring. The hatred between BYU and Utah is nothing compared to what it will be. It will be a crusade to beat BYU from now on. This is a prediction: in the next two years Utah will drill BYU someday, but we won’t run up the score even if we could set an NCAA record against them." The next year Howard made good on his promise, upsetting BYU 23–22.

In an interview after retiring, Howard hinted that he did not like aspects of the BYU rivalry. "There's too much religion involved," he said referring to the fact that the Church of Jesus Christ of Latter-day Saints owns BYU, and many fans of the two schools inject religion into the rivalry. "I did not like that. I really didn't.

Head coaching record

College

References

1931 births
Living people
Long Beach State 49ers football coaches
Redlands Bulldogs baseball players
UC Riverside Highlanders football coaches
Utah Utes football coaches
High school football coaches in California
Junior college football coaches in the United States
United States Air Force officers
People from Ontario, California
Coaches of American football from California
Baseball players from Denver
Baseball players from Long Beach, California
Military personnel from California